Catalina Paz Cáceres Ríos (born May 16, 1990), simply known as Catalina Cáceres, is a Chilean model and beauty pageant titleholder who was crowned Nuestra Belleza Chile and Miss Universo Chile in 2016. She represented Chile at the Miss Universe 2016 pageant.

Personal life
Catalina is an interior designer and was raised in Huechuraba. Her father is an engineer and her mother is an artist.  Caceres volunteers for Alzheimer Chilean Corporation and supports LGBT rights. Her answer after being asked about LGBT adoption and marriage rights during Miss Universo Chile made international headline news. 
 
Catalina is a vegetarian and she speaks English.

Pageantry

Nuestra Belleza Chile 2014
Catalina won the Nuestra Belleza Chile title in 2014, succeeding the previous winner Natalia Lermanda. She bested 21 other finalists in the said pageant. 
As part of her responsibilities, Catalina attended the "Green Fair" event that was held at Mapocho Station on September 7, 2014.

Miss Earth 2014
After winning Miss Earth Chile, Catalina flew to the Philippines in November to compete with nearly 100 other candidates to be Alyz Henrich's successor as Miss Earth. However, she failed to place. Miss Earth 2014 was won by Jamie Herrell of the Philippines.

Miss Universo Chile 2016
She was crowned as Miss Universo Chile 2016, making her Chile's representative for the Miss Universe 2016 pageant in the Philippines.

Miss Universe 2016
As Miss Universo Chile, she competed at the Miss Universe 2016 pageant but was ultimately unplaced.

References

Living people
People from Santiago
Miss Earth 2014 contestants
Chilean beauty pageant winners
1990 births
Chilean female models
Miss Universe 2016 contestants
Miss Universo Chile winners